This is a list of fellows of the Royal Society elected in 1721.

Fellows
 William Barrowby (1682–1751)
 John Beale (d. 1724)
 John Browne (d. 1735)
 Paul Dudley (1675–1751)
 William East (fl. 1721–1734)
 George Graham (1673–1751)
 Richard Hale (1670–1728)
 Thomas Hewett (1656–1726)
 George Savile (1678–1743)
 Conrad Joachim Sprengwell (d. 1740)
 William Western (?1694–1729)
 John Thomas Woolhouse (c. 1650–1734)

References

1721
1721 in science
1721 in England